Indian Institute of Science Education and Research, Thiruvananthapuram (abbreviated as IISER Thiruvananthapuram or IISER-TVM) is an autonomous public university located in Thiruvananthapuram, India. The institute is one of the seven IISERs established by the Ministry of Human Resource Development, Government of India, to bridge the gap between research and basic sciences' education at the undergraduate level. The six other IISERs are IISER Bhopal, IISER Kolkata, IISER Mohali, IISER Pune, IISER Tirupati and IISER Berhampur. All IISERs were declared as Institutes of National Importance by the Parliament of India in 2012 through the NIT Amendment Act.

IISER Thiruvananthapuram is an autonomous institution that awards Bachelor of Science & Master of Science (BS-MS) dual-degrees, and Doctor of Philosophy (Ph.D.) degrees in Mathematics, Physics, Chemistry and Biology. IISER TVM is to offer five new BS-MS programmes (i2 Sciences) and new 2 year M.Sc programmes in 2021. The campus is located at Vithura, about 40 km from Thiruvananthapuram, the capital city of Kerala state in India.

History 
Indian Institutes of Science Education and Research (IISERs) were established in 2006 through a proclamation of the Ministry of Education, Government of India to promote quality collegiate education and research in basic sciences. Each IISER is a degree-granting autonomous institution with a prime focus to integrate science education and research. IISERs receive generous funding from the Government of India.
Soon after MHRD's announcement in 2006, two of these institutes were established at Pune and Kolkata in 2006. This was followed by another institute at Mohali in 2007, and two more at Bhopal and Thiruvananthapuram in 2008. More recently, two more IISERs were established at Tirupati and Berhampur in 2015 and 2016 respectively.

Campus 

IISER TVM has one of the most beautiful campuses in India, located in the foothills of Western Ghats mountain ecosystem. Spanning around 200 acres, it is located 40 km from Thiruvananthapuram, Kerala.

Organization and administration

Governance 
The institute is administered by a Board of Governors with Dr. Madhavan Nair Rajeevan as Chairperson, Prof. S. Murty Srinivasula as Deputy Director, a 13-member Senate, and the Director, Prof. Jarugu Narasimha Moorthy. The deans are Prof. M. P. Rajan (Academics), Prof. Ramesh Chandra Nath (Students Affairs), Prof. Hema Somanathan (Research and Development) and Prof. Anil Shaji (Planning and Development). Previously, the board of governors was chaired by Tessy Thomas.

Departments

Academics

Academic programs

Dual-degree Bachelor of Science & Master of Science (BS-MS): The 5-year dual degree BS-MS program is the flagship program of all IISERs. The first two years of this program involves coursework in all subjects (Physics, Chemistry, Mathematics, Biology, Humanities and Interdisciplinary courses). For the next two years, the students choose courses in a 'Major' and a 'Minor' subject as per their research interests. The final year is solely spent on a research project in their Major subject. Admissions to the BS-MS program is highly competitive, with only the following students eligible to apply:

Kishore Vaigyanik Protsahan Yojana (KVPY) Basic Science Stream: Students who possess KVPY scholarships (in SA / SX / SB streams) in the current admission year
Joint Entrance Examination (Advanced): Students who secure a place in the common rank list of Joint Entrance Examination (Advanced) for admission to Indian Institutes of Technology (IITs)
 State and Central Boards: Students who secure a specified cut-off percentage (published each year) in their Higher Secondary (Class 12) Board Exams may be considered for admission after clearing an aptitude test. This is currently done in co-ordination with the other IISERs through a Joint Admission Program.

Doctoral of Philosophy (Ph.D.): Admission to the doctoral program is after a Master's degree in science. Besides the students of the dual-degree BS-MS program, postgraduate students with a master's degree in science from other Universities/Institutes can also be admitted to the doctoral program. The program will involve mandatory course work, a qualifying examination, thesis research under the guidance of a faculty member, an open seminar and a dissertation defense examination, leading to the award of a Ph.D. degree. The quantum of course work will vary depending on the background of the student. Besides individual research, students will be involved in several professional activities such as seminars, workshops, presentations and review meetings. All doctoral students will assist faculty members in teaching during the course of the doctoral program.
Integrated Doctor of Philosophy (Int. Ph.D.): Admission to this program is after a B.Sc. degree in any of the basic sciences subjects. Students of this program start by attending classes with third year students of dual degree BS-MS program. After completing the specified graduate coursework and clearing a comprehensive exam, the students begin their Ph.D. research under the guidance of faculty members. The duration of this program ranges from 6 to 7 years, depending on the required coursework and nature of research.

Rankings

Indian Institute of Science Education and Research, Thiruvananthapuram was ranked 80 in India by the National Institutional Ranking Framework in overall ranking in 2020. Nature Index ranked IISERs as a whole at 4th in the World's 'Top 30 academic institutions under 30' in high-quality research output. It also ranked IISERs at 37th in its overall list of World's Top 200 rising academic institutions.

Student life

Notable achievements 

 The Gravitational Wave Group at the School of Physics (part of the Indian Initiative in Gravitational-wave Observations (IndIGO) comprising scientists from nine institutions working under the LIGO) Scientific Collaboration (LSC), IISER TVM also contributed to historic discovery of gravitational waves.
 IISER TVM students builds an affordable radio telescope.

Conferences and workshops 

 Indian Strings Meeting (ISM), 2018

 Chromosome Stability 2016 
 All India Cell Biology Conference 
 Cryo Electron Microscopy and 3D Image Processing of Macromolecular Assemblies and Cellular Tomography (CEM3DIP)
 Workshop on High Performance Scientific Computing
 International Symposium on Clusters, Cluster-Assemblies and Nanomaterials (ISCAN)
 Indo-UK Workshop on Stochastic Partial Differential Equations and Applications
 8th Asian Photochemistry Conference 2014 
 GW@ASI2014: Satellite workshop on Gravitational Wave Astronomy at the ASI Meeting

See also 
 List of autonomous higher education institutes in India
 List of universities in India
IRINS profile
IISER Admission
IISER Comprehensive overview

References

External links
Official website

Arts and Science colleges in Kerala
Thiruvananthapuram, Indian Institutes of Science Education and Research
2008 establishments in Kerala
Research institutes in Thiruvananthapuram
Physics institutes
Research institutes established in 2008